The Korea Drama Awards is an awards ceremony for excellence in television in South Korea. It was established in 2007, and is held annually in October in Jinju, South Gyeongsang Province as the official main event of the annual Korea Drama Festival (which was launched a year ago). The eligibility period is October of the previous year to September of the current year. Nominees are chosen from Korean dramas that aired on the three major broadcasting networks (KBS, MBC and SBS) and cable channels.

The 2009 ceremony was cancelled due to the swine flu pandemic.

The 2020 and 2021 ceremonies were cancelled due to the COVID-19 pandemic.

Categories

Grand Prize (Daesang)
Best Drama
Best Production Director
Best Screenplay
Top Excellence Award, Actor
Top Excellence Award, Actress
Excellence Award, Actor
Excellence Award, Actress
Best Supporting Actor
Best Supporting Actress
Best New Actor
Best New Actress
Best Young Actor/Actress
Best Original Soundtrack
Special Jury Prize

Grand Prize (Daesang)

Best Drama

Best Production Director

Best Screenplay

Top Excellence Award, Actor

Top Excellence Award, Actress

Excellence Award, Actor

Excellence Award, Actress

Best Supporting Actor

Best Supporting Actress

Best New Actor

Best New Actress

Best Young Actor/Actress

Best Original Soundtrack

Special Jury Prize

Most Popular Actor

Most Popular Actress

Best Couple Award

Hallyu Star Award

Lifetime Achievement Award

Other Awards

See also

 List of Asian television awards

References

External links 
  
 Korea Drama Awards at Daum 

 
South Korean television awards
Awards established in 2007
Annual events in South Korea